Anthony Leahy (born 1963) is a former Irish sportsperson. He played Gaelic football with his local club St Finbarr's and was a member at senior level of the Cork county team in the 1980s. He later managed Cork's under-21 team, leading them to the All-Ireland Championship in 2007.

References

1963 births
Living people
Cork inter-county Gaelic footballers
Gaelic football managers
Munster inter-provincial Gaelic footballers
St Finbarr's Gaelic footballers